Vladyslav Sukhomlynov (born 2 January 1978) is a retired footballer who played as a midfielder for clubs in Ukraine, Greece and Kazakhstan.

Club career
Sukhomlynov spent most of his career playing football for Ukrainian Premier League sides FC Borysfen Boryspil, FC Chornomorets Odessa, FC Kryvbas Kryvyi Rih and FC Metalist Kharkiv. He also spent time in the Ukrainian lower leagues with Borysfen Boryspil, FC Inter Boyarka and FC CSKA Kyiv.

In July 2001, Sukhomlynov joined Greek Superleague side Panachaiki F.C. for six months.

References

External links

Profile at legioner.kulichki.com
ΞΕΝΟΙ ΠΑΙΚΤΕΣ ΚΑΙ ΠΡΟΠΟΝΗΤΕΣ ΤΗΣ ΠΑΝΑΧΑΪΚΗΣ

1978 births
Living people
Ukrainian footballers
Ukrainian Premier League players
FC Borysfen Boryspil players
FC Chornomorets Odesa players
FC Kryvbas Kryvyi Rih players
FC Obolon-Brovar Kyiv players
FC Metalist Kharkiv players
FC CSKA Kyiv players
Panachaiki F.C. players
FC Irtysh Pavlodar players

Association football midfielders